Yara Yavelberg  (May 7, 1943 – August 20, 1971) was a Brazilian psychologist and university lecturer, member of the Brazilian resistance movement against the Brazilian military government. She was believed to have killed herself in Salvador, Bahia in 1971, but a recent autopsy has shown that she has been murdered by security agents.

Biography
Yara Yavelberg was born in São Paulo. She was initially a passive supporter of the resistance movement, but eventually became a member of MR-8. She had a relationship with Carlos Lamarca, a Brazilian Army officer who deserted and became one of the most important leaders of the guerrilla movement that opposed the dictatorship. With the collapse of the guerrilla movement, Yavelberg and Lamarca fled to Bahia.

Homages
University of São Paulo's Psychology Institute paid a homage to Yavelberg, an alumnus of their Psychology School, by naming its academic center the Yara Yavelberg Academic Center.

She was a friend of the former Brazilian president Dilma Rousseff, who paid a tribute to her during the launch of Rousseff's candidacy.

See also
 Em Busca de Iara, a 2013 documentary film.

References

1943 births
1971 deaths
People from São Paulo
Brazilian Jews
Brazilian civil rights activists
Psychology educators
Brazilian psychologists
Brazilian women psychologists
20th-century Brazilian physicians
Dead and missing in the fight against the military dictatorship in Brazil (1964–1985)
Assassinated Brazilian people
University of São Paulo alumni
20th-century psychologists